Hopeful Unity is a historic house at 25789 Lambs Meadow Road in Worton, Maryland.  It is a three-story brick building, three bays wide, with a -story kitchen ell.  The main house is generally believed to have been built about 1761, after the property was purchased by Charles Groome.  The ell may encapsulate an even older structure.  The house is a well-preserved example of colonial Eastern Shore architecture.

The house was listed on the National Register of Historic Places in 2015.

See also
National Register of Historic Places listings in Kent County, Maryland

References

External links
, at Maryland Historical Trust

Houses on the National Register of Historic Places in Maryland
Houses in Kent County, Maryland
Houses completed in 1761
1761 establishments in the Thirteen Colonies
National Register of Historic Places in Kent County, Maryland